The University Neighborhood Historic District is a  historic district near the University of Utah campus in northeastern Salt Lake City, Utah, United States, that was listed on the National Register of Historic Places in 1995.

Description
The district's listing included 451 contributing buildings, a contributing structure, and two contributing sites, as well as 134 non-contributing buildings and 9 properties already NRHP-listed.

The district is roughly bounded by 500 South, South Temple, 1100 East, and University Street in Salt Lake City. It includes works by architects Ware & Treganza, Carl Neuhausen and others. Also included is the home of architect David C. Dart.  Dart "built the house at 206 Douglas for his family in 1907. He was a well-known local architect who designed buildings around Salt Lake City, including the Judge Building (National Register 1979), Patrick Dry Goods Building, and Our Lady of Lourdes Chapel (all still in existence)."

Another residence in the district is at 1133 East 300 South and  the principal residence of educator William M. Stewart, who served 25 years at the University of Utah, including assisting the rise of the Stewart School there, which trained teachers. William M. Stewart also had a summer residence, a log cabin in Wasatch County, Utah, the Ethelbert White and William M. Stewart Ranch House, which is separately listed on the NRHP.

See also

 National Register of Historic Places listings in Salt Lake City

References

External links

Historic districts on the National Register of Historic Places in Utah
National Register of Historic Places in Salt Lake City
Victorian architecture in Utah
Tudor Revival architecture in the United States